The Bloomsbury School District is a community public school district that serves students in pre-kindergarten through eighth grade from Bloomsbury, in Hunterdon County, New Jersey, United States.

As of the 2017-18 school year, the district, consisting of one school, had an enrollment of 87 students and 11.3 classroom teachers (on an FTE basis), for a student–teacher ratio of 7.7:1. In the 2016-17 school year, the district had the 11th-smallest enrollment of any school district in the state.

The district participates in the Interdistrict Public School Choice Program, having been approved on November 2, 1999, as one of the first ten districts statewide to participate in the program. Seats in the program for non-resident students are specified by the district and are allocated by lottery, with tuition paid for eligible participating students by the New Jersey Department of Education.

The district is classified by the New Jersey Department of Education as being in District Factor Group "GH", the third-highest of eight groupings. District Factor Groups organize districts statewide to allow comparison by common socioeconomic characteristics of the local districts. From lowest socioeconomic status to highest, the categories are A, B, CD, DE, FG, GH, I and J.

Public school students in ninth through twelfth grades attend Phillipsburg High School in Phillipsburg in Warren County, as part of a sending/receiving relationship with the Phillipsburg School District. The high school also serves students from four other sending communities: Alpha, Greenwich Township, Lopatcong Township and Pohatcong Township. As of the 2017-18 school year, the high school had an enrollment of 1,663 students and 124.5 classroom teachers (on an FTE basis), for a student–teacher ratio of 13.4:1.

In 2016, the district announced that it was pursuing a $30,000 study to consider merger / consolidation with the Greenwich Township School District in Warren County, citing the "financial instability" the Bloomsbury district faces based on the way the Phillipsburg district calculates the costs for students sent for high school. The notice to residents announcing the feasibility study stated that the Greenwich district was chosen based on the quality of its academic programs, shared superintendent and business administrator, proximity, financial stability and shared sending relationship with Phillipsburg for high school.

School
Bloomsbury Public School served an enrollment of 87 students as of the 2017-18 school year.
Dr. Jenniffer Marycz, Principal

Administration
Core members of the district's administration are:
Dr. Jenniffer Marycz, Superintendent
Timothy Mantz, Business Administrator / Board Secretary

Board of education
The district's board of education is comprised of five members who set policy and oversee the fiscal and educational operation of the district through its administration. As a Type II school district, the board's trustees are elected directly by voters to serve three-year terms of office on a staggered basis, with either one or two seats up for election each year held (since 2012) as part of the November general election. The board appoints a superintendent to oversee the district's day-to-day operations and a business administrator to supervise the business functions of the district.

References

External links
School District

School Data for the Bloomsbury School District, National Center for Education Statistics
Phillipsburg High School

Bloomsbury, New Jersey
New Jersey District Factor Group GH
School districts in Hunterdon County, New Jersey
Public K–8 schools in New Jersey